Pablo Ferrero (born 6 September 1939) is an Argentine rower. He competed in the men's coxless pair event at the 1960 Summer Olympics.

References

1939 births
Living people
Argentine male rowers
Olympic rowers of Argentina
Rowers at the 1960 Summer Olympics
Sportspeople from Rosario, Santa Fe
Pan American Games medalists in rowing
Pan American Games silver medalists for Argentina
Pan American Games bronze medalists for Argentina
Rowers at the 1959 Pan American Games